Darko Šuković (Cyrillic: Дарко Шуковић; 1 March 1963, Pavino Polje, Bijelo Polje) is Montenegrin journalist, owner and editor in chief at Radio Antena M and news website Portal Antena M, editor and host of the popular TV talk show Živa istina.

Career
Graduated law at University of Law in Podgorica.

His career as a journalist started 1988 at Radio Titograd (now Radio Crne Gore). Since 1990 he was editor in chief of magazine Krug, first independent political newsletter in Montenegro, and 1991 started working as a journalist at weekly magazine Monitor.

1994–1996 he was editor in chief at Antena M, first independent news radio station in Montenegro. From 1998 to 2001 he was deputy chief editor at Televizija Crne Gore. Since 1 October 2001 he's back at Antena M, as CEO, editor in chief and owner.

In 2016 he founded and online news platform Portal Antena M.

Živa istina, talk show
Mr. Šuković is author and host of TV talk show named Živa istina, the talk show in Montenegro. Broadcasting of Živa istina started in 2002, and it's being broadcast continuously, to this date, first on TV IN, then TV Atlas, and from 2016, on TV Prva.

References
 Interview with Darko Šuković for portal Analitika: Volim što se i danas kao dijete radujem nekim malim stvarima, (2014)
 Živa istina, Živa istina, guest Goran Milić (2013)

References

Montenegrin journalists
Male journalists
Living people
1963 births
People from Bijelo Polje